Belle Haven may refer to:

Belle Haven, a neighborhood in Menlo Park, California 
Belle Haven, a community in Greenwich town, Fairfield County, Connecticut
Belle Haven, Fairfax County, Virginia
Belle Haven, Accomack County, Virginia
Belle Haven Consultants